Hypera compta is a species of true weevil in the family of beetles which is known as Curculionidae. It is found in North America.

References

Further reading

 
 

Hyperinae
Articles created by Qbugbot
Beetles described in 1831